Ronaldo Munck is an Argentine sociologist who has worked on the political sociology and globalisation of Latin America and Ireland.

Biography

Ronaldo Munck was born and educated in Argentina. He completed his PhD in political sociology at the University of Essex in 1976 under the supervision of Ernesto Laclau.

He was Senior Lecturer in Sociology, University of Ulster (1984-1988), Reader in Sociology, University of Ulster (1988-1994),Professor of Sociology and Head of Department, University of Durban (1994-1996), Professor of Political Sociology, University of Liverpool and Director, Globalisation and Social Exclusion Unit (1996-2004), and Head of Civic Engagement, President's Office, Dublin City University (2004 to date).

Academic research

Latin America
Munck's works on Latin America include Politics and Dependency in the Third World: The Case of Latin America (1984) on dependency theory, Latin America: The Transition to Democracy (1989), three editions of Contemporary Latin America (2002, 2007, 2012), and the Gramscian Rethinking Latin America: Development, Hegemony and Social Transformation (2013).

Ireland
Munck's works on Irish political sociology include Ireland: Nation, State and Class Conflict (1985), Belfast in the Thirties: An Oral History (1987), The Irish Economy: Results and Prospects (1993), and Globalisation, Migration and Social Change in Ireland: After the Celtic Tiger (2011, co-edited with Bryan Fanning).

Comparative labor studies
Munck's comparative labor studies include The New International Labour Studies (1988),Argentina: From Anarchism to Peronism: Workers, unions and politics 1855-1985 (1986), Labour Worldwide in the Era of Globalisation: Alternative Unions Models in the New World Order (1998, co-edited with Peter Waterman), Labour and Globalisation: The New 'Great Transformation''' (2002), and Globalisation and Contestation: The Great Counter-Movement (2006).

Political sociology and social theory
Munck's publications on political sociology and social theory include The Difficult Dialogue: Marxism and Nationalism (1986) and Marx @ 2000: Late Marxist Perspectives (2000) which sought to renew Marxism in conversations with post-modernism, as well as the collection on critical development theory co-edited with Denis O’Hearn Critical Development Theory: Contributions to a New Paradigm (1999) and the study Water and Development: Good governance after Neoliberalism (2015).

Others
Munck also studied human migration Globalisation and Migration: New Conflicts, New Politics (2008) and human security Globalisation and Security'' (2009, co-edited with Honor Fagan).

Personal life

Munck's grandmother is swimmer Lilian Harrison. His brother is political scientist Gerardo L. Munck.

References

External links
 Personal Homepage Prof Munck
 Interview – Ronaldo Munck

Argentine expatriates in Ireland
Argentine sociologists
Living people
Academics of Dublin City University
Alumni of the University of Essex
1951 births